Daniel Osorno Calvillo (born 16 March 1979) is a Mexican former professional footballer who played as a striker and winger.

Career
Osorno made his debut on 11 January 1997 in a game against Tecos UAG and quickly became one of the main goal scorers for Atlas. During this time, he was one of several players in the Atlas youth system to eventually join the Mexico national team, along with teammates such as Rafael Márquez, Juan Pablo Rodríguez, and Miguel Zepeda. Under the direction of head coach Ricardo Antonio Lavolpe, Atlas became a leading contender, with Osorno regularly starting on the left wing. In the Verano 1999 competition Atlas reached the final, but lost on penalties to Toluca. For seven years Daniel was a symbolic player for Atlas. However, his form began to deteriorate after dealing with some injury problems. Osorno was loaned out to Monterrey for a year in 2003. He made his return to Atlas in 2004, but did not manage to return to his old form.

Osorno announced after the conclusion of the 2006–2007 season his departure from Club Atlas, and CF Monterrey and Santos Laguna showing interest in acquiring his services. On 1 August 2007 it was announced that Osorno had signed with the American team Colorado Rapids. He played only 3 games with the team.

Osorno returned to Mexico and was signed by Puebla F.C., where his career experienced a recovery.

International career
Osorno was called up for the U-20 Mexico national team in 1999. Later in that year he made his debut with the Mexico national team, against Croatia on 16 June 1999. He has played in several international tournaments with Mexico, including three Copa América tournaments: 1999, 2001, and 2004. Osorno was a member of the team that beat Brazil in the 1999 FIFA Confederations Cup, but saw no playing time in that tournament. He also missed out on the 2002 FIFA World Cup, where he was one of the last players cut from the squad by coach Javier Aguirre.

Osorno also represented Mexico at the 2003 Gold Cup, where he scored the tournament-winning Golden Goal in the final match against Brazil. Osorno's final international appearance came against South Korea on February 15, 2006.

He also has a regional Mexican music band called Banda Pura Caña de Daniel Osorno.

International goals

Honours
Mexico
FIFA Confederations Cup: 1999
CONCACAF Gold Cup: 2003

References

 Announcement of signing with Colorado

External links
 
 
 Daniel Osorno at FootballDatabase.com

1979 births
Living people
Footballers from Guadalajara, Jalisco
Mexican footballers
Mexico under-20 international footballers
Mexico international footballers
Association football forwards
Atlas F.C. footballers
C.F. Monterrey players
Colorado Rapids players
Dorados de Sinaloa footballers
Club Puebla players
Correcaminos UAT footballers
Liga MX players
Major League Soccer players
CONCACAF Gold Cup-winning players
1999 Copa América players
1999 FIFA Confederations Cup players
2001 Copa América players
2003 CONCACAF Gold Cup players
2004 Copa América players
2005 CONCACAF Gold Cup players
FIFA Confederations Cup-winning players